The following highways are numbered 500:

Australia
 Great Alpine Road

Canada
Alberta Highway 500
Manitoba Provincial Road 500
Newfoundland and Labrador Route 500

Japan
 Japan National Route 500

South Korea
 Gwangju Ring Expressway

United States
States
  Florida State Road 500
  Georgia State Route 500 (state designation for the cancelled Outer Perimeter)
  Louisiana Highway 500
  Maryland Route 500
  New Mexico State Road 500
  North Carolina Highway 500
  Ohio State Route 500
  Washington State Route 500
Territories
  Puerto Rico Highway 500